The DDT Sky Tower is an unfinished office skyscraper in Quezon City, Metro Manila, Philippines.

Background
The DDT Sky Tower is a project of DataLand Inc. and is the first project of the company under its office spaces arm, DataLand Offices. The 60-storey building will stand on a  land and will have a total leasable office space of  reportedly the biggest in the Philippine office space industry as of mid-2019. The office spaces of the building will be divided into three zones: Low zone (16th to 27th floors), mid zone (28th zone) and high zone (43rd to 57th floors). Parking spaces is allocated to the building's 3rd to 13th floors and three basement levels with 1,122 parking slots above ground and 312 parking slots underground. The first two floors are allotted for retail space and the 14th floor will host a food court for the employees of the building's tenants.
The building has accreditation from the Philippine Economic Zone Authority and LEED certification is being aspired for the building.

Delay
On 2022, the construction of the DDT Sky Tower was delayed, because it stays on the 2nd or 3rd floor for many months. Soon, it was confirmed that it will become a mixed-use development called the 947 Sky Towers to be launched in 2023.

References

Buildings and structures in Quezon City
Buildings and structures under construction in Metro Manila
Skyscraper office buildings in Metro Manila